Philip Sheppard may refer to:

 Philip Sheppard (biologist) (1921-1976), British geneticist and lepidopterist
 Philip Sheppard (musician) (born 1969), English musician